The Armoured Corps Training Centre in Munster is one of the German Army's training centres (Zentren des Heeres) with particular responsibility for the basic and continuation training of armoured troops, including the armoured and the mechanized infantry corps of the German Army. By tradition, the centre is nicknamed the Armoured Corps School (Panzertruppenschule) whose tasks it partly subsumed on 1 October 2007.

Literature

External links 
Armoured Corps Training Centre
German Tank Museum

German Army (1956–present)
Bundeswehr
1956 establishments in West Germany
Military units and formations established in 1956